William Heath (by 1533 – 1568/70), of Alvechurch, Worcestershire, was an English politician. He was a Member of the Parliament of England for Ludlow in 1555, and for Ripon in 1558. He had two legitimate sons, two legitimate daughters and one illegitimate son.

References

16th-century deaths
English MPs 1555
Politicians from Worcestershire
Year of birth uncertain
English MPs 1558
People from Alvechurch